Know Your Product: The Best of The Saints is a 1996 compilation album of the Australian band The Saints' years with the EMI subsidiary Harvest Records.

Track listing

 "I'm Stranded"
 "(This) Perfect Day" (Single version)
 "Lipstick on Your Collar"
 "River Deep, Mountain High" (Ike & Tina Turner Cover)
 "Demolition Girl"
 "One Way Street"
 "Story of Love"
 "Kissin' Cousins" (Elvis Presley Cover)
 "No Time"
 "Wild About You"
 "Messin' With The Kid"
 "Nights In Venice"
 "Do The Robot"
 "Know Your Product"
 "Run Down"
 "Lost and Found"
 "Memories Are Made of This"
 "Private Affair"
 "A Minor Aversion"
 "No, Your Product"
 "Swing For The Crime"
 "All Times Through Paradise"

References

The Saints (Australian band) compilation albums
1996 greatest hits albums
Harvest Records compilation albums